Everett B. Cole (1910-2001) was an American writer of science fiction short stories and a professional soldier.  He fought at Omaha Beach during World War II and worked as a signal maintenance and property officer at Fort Douglas, Utah, retiring in 1960. He got a bachelor's degree in Math and Physics and became a Math, Physics, and Chemistry teacher at Yorktown High School in Texas. His first science fiction story, "Philosophical Corps" was published in the magazine Astounding in 1951.  His fix-up of that story and two others, The Philosophical Corps, was published by Gnome Press in 1962.  A second novel, The Best Made Plans, was serialized in Astounding in 1959, but never published in book form.  He also co-authored historical books about the south Texas region.

References

External links

 
  
 

American science fiction writers
1910 births
1977 deaths
American male short story writers
20th-century American novelists
American male novelists
20th-century American short story writers
20th-century American male writers